The Deputy Chief Minister of Odisha is a member of the Cabinet of Odisha Government in the Government of Odisha. Not a constitutional office, it seldom carries any specific powers. A deputy chief minister usually also holds a cabinet portfolio such as home minister or finance minister. In the parliamentary system of government, the Chief Minister is treated as the "first among equals" in the cabinet; the position of deputy chief minister is used to bring political stability and strength within a coalition government.

List of Deputy Chief Ministers

See also 
 List of current Indian deputy chief ministers

References

Deputy chief ministers of Odisha
Odisha
deputy chief ministers